LZS Tarant Wójcin was a Polish football club based in Wójcin playing in "A Klasa" (level 6) or B Klasa (level 7) of Polish division. The club history started in the early 1990s when the club joined KPZPN and started playing in 'B Klasa' (level 7 - the lowest level in Poland at that time). In June 2006 LZS Tarant Wójcin won the promotion to the A klasa but was disbanded in 2009 before being re-founded in 2011. The team kit consists of a white shirt with blue arms, blue shorts and blue socks.

History 
The history of Tarant Wójcin began in the 1993 . In that time the group of people from local arena decided to reactivate the old club Błękitni Wójcin (Blue Wójcin). This club was quite popular in the arena in 70th and 80th. However they called themselves Tarant, which means a kind of horse,  but use old colour of t-shirts. The main person who was main inspirator of reactivation was Karol Łaszkiewicz - player, chairman and manager in one person. Thanks his attitiude the club could exist many years until now. The first year of existence was quite difficult. The team had to play their home matches far from home, because there wasn't any pitch where they could play. In the late 90th Tarant finally got a pitch and could play at home. 
The rivalization in league was always dramatic. Tarant in almost every season was close to achieve promotion to higher class, but always something happened and it failed. Fortunately in the season 2005/2006 [Karol Łaszkiewicz built a team who achieve big success winning promotion to A-klasa. In the first season in A Klasa the Karol Łaszkiewicz's team reached fifth place. Next season (2007/2008) was the last one of legendary chairman and manager Karol Łaszkiewicz. He resigned after humiliating defeat against Burza Nowa Wieś Wielka 0:8 . Former player Gerard Ziółkowski became a new chairman of club. The team ended season 2007/2008 on 9th place. Season 2008/09 was paradoxically the best and the worst in Tarant's history. The team won promotion to Liga Okręgowa, but due to financial problems the team was incorporated and renamed on Kujawskie-Pogranicze Jeziora Wielkie. The last game of Tarant Wójcin took place on August 2, 2009 - the game in Polish Cup - Regional Round against Orłowianka Orłowo . The result was 3:3 (Tarant won Penalty Shoutout 3:2) . The last goal for Tarant was scored by Waldemar Humaj.

After folding in 2009 the team restarted from the B-klasa in 2011.

The most notable people of team are the captain from many year Dariusz Budkiewicz, Mariusz Mochański (who played many season at Tarant's t-shirt) and the manager Karol Łaszkiewicz.

Rivals 
The main rivals of Tarant Wójcin were two clubs from the same commune - LZS Gopło Kościeszki and LZS Jeziora Wielkie.

Records 
 Biggest win : Tarant Wójcin - Kujawiak Sukowy 13:0 B Klasa 2004/2005 season
 Biggest defeat : Tarant Wójcin - Burza Nowa Wieś Wielka 0:8 A Klasa 2007/2008 season

References
 Info about club on 90minut.pl

Association football clubs established in 1993
1993 establishments in Poland
Mogilno County
Football clubs in Kuyavian-Pomeranian Voivodeship